The 2004 Canadian Mixed Curling Championship was held January 10–18, 2004 at the McIntyre Curling Club in Timmins, Ontario.

The 2004 Mixed was the last Canadian Mixed Championship to be held in the same calendar year as it was billed as, until 2021. The 2005 Canadian Mixed Curling Championship would be held in November 2004.

Shannon Kleibrink, skip of the Alberta team became the first (and to date only) woman to skip a team to national mixed title, when her foursome defeated Ontario's Heath McCormick in the final.

Teams

Standings

Results

Draw 1

Draw 2

Draw 3

Draw 4

Draw 5

Draw 6

Draw 7

Draw 8

Draw 9

Draw 10

Draw 11

Playoffs

1 vs. 2

3 vs. 4

Semifinal

Final

External links
Event statistics

References

Canadian Mixed Curling Championship
Curling in Northern Ontario
2004 in Canadian curling
2004 in Ontario
Sport in Timmins
January 2004 sports events in Canada